Phantom Express may refer to:

 Boeing XS-1 Phantom Express (2017), cancelled experimental highly reusable spaceplane
The Phantom Express (1932 film), U.S. mystery crime drama
 The Phantom Express (1925 film), U.S. silent crime film
 The Phantom Express (1942 radio episode), season 2 number 6 episode 58 of Inner Sanctum, see List of Inner Sanctum episodes
 The Phantom Express (2013 TV episode), season 17 number 13 episode 401 of Thomas & Friends, see List of Thomas & Friends episodes
 Mystic Midway: Phantom Express (1993 videogame), sequel to the 1992 video game Mystic Midway: Rest in Pieces, see List of CD-i games
 "Phantom Express" (amusement park ride) a 2015 amusement park attraction in Margate, Kent, England, UK; at Dreamland Margate

See also

 
 Phantom (disambiguation)
 Express (disambiguation)